Patricia Peklar is a Slovenian beauty pageant title holder. She was selected Miss Earth Slovenia in 2014.

Category
Miss Earth 2014
Miss Slovenia
Miss Eco Universe International 2015 
Model & Singer

References

External links
 Miss Earth Official Website

Miss Earth 2014 contestants
Slovenian beauty pageant winners
Living people
Slovenian female models
Year of birth missing (living people)